The Carnegie Library is a historic Carnegie library located at Muncie, Indiana, United States.  The building houses the Local History & Genealogy collection and an open computer lab. The facility also provides wireless access and a meeting room for local groups to reserve. It is one of four branches that make up the Muncie Public Library System. The building was made possible through a financial donation to the City of Muncie by Andrew Carnegie to expand their library system throughout the community. The foundation for Carnegie Library was built in 1902 and the building opened to the public in 1904. It has been in continuous use as a library since its opening. The building is located in downtown Muncie at the intersection of Jackson and Jefferson.

History 
The Carnegie Library was dedicated on January 1, 1904. The library was built after a donation of $55,000 was given to the City of Muncie by Andrew Carnegie, with the goal to assist them in expanding their library system throughout the community. The library was one of the first structures in Indiana built from the funding of Andrew Carnegie, who was a major philanthropist, who supported library systems throughout the world. The plot of land where the building is located was a gift from local businessman George Spilker. , the library continues to house the local history and genealogy department of the Muncie Library System.

Architecture 
The design and building of the library was conducted by the architectural firm of Wing and Mahurin of Fort Wayne, Indiana. The exterior structure is made of Indiana Limestone and modeled after Greek and classical architectural forms. The exterior of the building remains in its original state. The neoclassical architectural style includes a Romanesque dome located on the roof, in the central part of the library.

Local history and genealogy 
The Carnegie Library offers a variety of resources to aid researchers in discovering local history and their ancestry. Some of the resources include: cemetery records; census records; county histories and records; court documents; directories; family histories; funeral home records; microfilm for various Muncie and Delaware County newspapers from 1837-present; obituaries; Sanborn fire insurance maps for 1883, 1887, 1889, 1892, 1902, and 1911-1950; and vital records such as marriage, birth, and death records from the 19th and 20th centuries.

See also
List of Carnegie libraries in Indiana

References

External links
 Muncie Public Library
 Muncie Public Library Historic Documents Digital Media Repository, Ball State University Libraries
 "What Middletown Read" database A collaborative project between the Center for Middletown Studies, Muncie Public Library, and Ball State University Libraries

Carnegie libraries in Indiana
Libraries on the National Register of Historic Places in Indiana
Neoclassical architecture in Indiana
Library buildings completed in 1904
Education in Delaware County, Indiana
Buildings and structures in Muncie, Indiana
National Register of Historic Places in Muncie, Indiana
1904 establishments in Indiana